Moonie is a surname. Notable people with the surname include:

Jeff Moonie Jr., American film director
Lewis Moonie (born 1947), British politician
P. J. Moonie (1936–2016), Australian radio operator